The paleo-Hispanic languages were the languages of the Pre-Roman peoples of the Iberian Peninsula, excluding languages of foreign colonies, such as Greek in Emporion and Phoenician in Qart Hadast. After the Roman conquest of Hispania the Paleohispanic languages, with the exception of Proto-Basque, were replaced by Latin, the ancestor of the modern Iberian Romance languages.

Languages 
Some of these languages were documented directly through inscriptions, mainly in Paleohispanic scripts, that date for sure between the 5th century BC, maybe from the 7th century in the opinion of some researchers, until the end of the 1st century BC or the beginning of the 1st century AD.

 Vasconic languages
 Proto-Basque — Unattested, partially reconstructed through internal analysis of modern Basque. Proto-Basque is also the ancestor or sibling of the Aquitanian language (see below).
 Aquitanian — Close relative of modern Basque. Some scholars characterise Aquitanian as an ancestor of Basque, while others describe Aquitanian and Basque as siblings both descended from Proto-Basque.

 Unclassified languages
 Iberian — Shares many obvious similarities with the Vasconic languages. However, lack of data has thus far prevented scholars from determining whether these similarities arose from convergence due to intense contact, or whether Iberian does in fact possess a genetic relationship to the Vasconic languages.
 Tartessian — Scholarly opinion places Tartessian definitely outside of the Indo-European family, but further classification remains uncertain. Tartessian seems to have borrowed many place names from some Celtic and/or other Indo-European languages; but its syllable structure is totally incompatible with the phonology of any Indo-European language, and much more compatible with the phonology of the Vasconic languages and Iberian. Despite this phonological compatibility, a lack of data has thus far made it impossible to clarify any relationship with the Vasconic languages or Iberian.
 Indo-European languages
 Celtic languages
 Celtiberian
 Gallaecian
 (Internally unclassified languages)
 Lusitanian — Definitely an Indo-European language. Possibly Celtic or Italic, but a lack of data has prevented scholars from determining exactly where Lusitanian fits within the Indo-European family.
  (from Greek σορός sorós 'funerary urn' and θαπτός thaptós 'buried') is a hypothetical pre-Celtic language. Joan Coromines identified problematic words in Catalan with inscriptions on lead tablets, from ca. 2nd century CE, found at Amélie-les-Bains on the Catalan–French border. The inscriptions include some Latin but also a non-Latin and non-Celtic component that Coromines identifies with the Urnfield culture from a millennium earlier, claiming to have found such "Sorothaptic" place names across Europe. Like the better-known Vasconic substrate hypothesis, Coromines' Sorothaptic hypothesis has not been well received. 

Other Paleohispanic languages can only be identified indirectly through toponyms, anthroponyms or theonyms cited by Roman and Greek sources.

Classification 
Of these languages, Celtiberian, Gallaecian, Lusitanian, and presumably Sorothaptic were Indo-European languages; Celtiberian and Gallaecian were Celtic languages, and Lusitanian may also have been, but the hypothetical Sorothaptic was not. Aquitanian was a precursor of Basque, while Tartessian and Iberian remain unclassified.

See also 
 Iberian languages
 Languages of Spain
 Languages of Portugal
 Hispano-Celtic languages
 Vasconic substrate hypothesis
 Paleo-European languages
 Pre-Indo-European languages

References

Further reading 
 COROMINES, JOAN. "Les Plombs Sorothaptiques d'Arles". In: Zeitschrift für romanische Philologie (ZrP) 91, no. 1-2 (1975): 1-53. https://doi.org/10.1515/zrph.1975.91.1-2.1
 Correa, José Antonio (1994): «La lengua ibérica», Revista española de lingüística 24, 2, pp. 263–287.
 Jordán, Carlos (2004): Celtibérico, Zaragoza.
 Hoz, Javier de (1995): «Tartesio, fenicio y céltico, 25 años después», Tartessos 25 años después, pp. 591–607.
 de Hoz Bravo, Jesús Javier; Churruca, Joaquín Gorrochategui Churruca. "Paleohispánica y Filología Clásica". In: Conuentus Classicorum: temas y formas del Mundo Clásico. Coord. por Jesús de la Villa, Emma Falque Rey, José Francisco González Castro, María José Muñoz Jiménez, Vol. 1, 2017, pp. 119-150.  
 Rodríguez Ramos, Jesús (2005): «Introducció a l'estudi de les inscripcions ibèriques», Revista de la Fundació Privada Catalana per l'Arqueologia ibèrica, 1, pp. 13–144.
 Untermann, Jürgen : Monumenta Linguarum Hispanicarum, Wiesbaden. (1975): I Die Münzlegenden. (1980): II Die iberischen Inschriften aus Sudfrankreicht. (1990): III Die iberischen Inschriften aus Spanien. (1997): IV Die tartessischen, keltiberischen und lusitanischen Inschriften.
 Vallejo Ruiz, J. M. (2021). "Lengua lusitana y onomástica de Lusitania. 25 años después". In: Palaeohispanica. Revista Sobre Lenguas Y Culturas De La Hispania Antigua, 21, 369-395. https://doi.org/10.36707/palaeohispanica.v21i0.409
 Velaza, Javier (1996): Epigrafía y lengua ibéricas, Barcelona.

External links 
 Pre-Roman languages and writing systems from Spain and Portugal – Jesús Rodríguez Ramos
 Detailed map of the Pre-Roman Peoples of Iberia (around 200 BC)

 
Extinct languages of Europe
Pre-Indo-Europeans
Extinct languages of Spain